is a 1993 card battle role-playing game developed by Tose and published by Bandai for the Family Computer game console. Based on the Dragon Ball franchise, the player's movement and battle choices are dictated by randomly generated playing cards.

The game sold 300,000 copies, and was adapted into a 1993 original video animation (OVA) series that was released in two parts as strategy guides. Footage from the OVA was reused in a 1994 Playdia video game, and the OVA was completely remade in 2010.

Gameplay
Dragon Ball Z Side Story: Plan to Eradicate the Saiyans is a card battle role-playing game, where the player's movement and battle choices are dictated by the randomly generated playing cards. The multiplayer mode is a six player tournament using difficulty levels of computer players that are in the save file. Players can choose between Goku, Gohan, Piccolo, Trunks and Vegeta. Winner records are kept in the game data, as well as any moves the player might learn.

Plot
Dr. Raichi is the lone survivor of the Tuffles, a race that once lived on Planet Plant before the invasion of the Saiyans. The Saiyans not only massacred the entire Tuffle race, but also stole their technology and conquered the planet; renaming it Planet Vegeta in honor of their king. Raichi managed to escape and found refuge on the Dark Planet and prepared to eradicate the last remaining Saiyans.

On Earth, he sends devices that emit a substance called Destron Gas that can destroy all life. When Mr. Popo finds out that only a few hours remain until the planet's destruction, Goku, Gohan, Vegeta, Trunks, and Piccolo rush to destroy the devices located around the planet. They manage to destroy all but one that is protected by an impenetrable energy barrier. However, Frieza, Cooler, Turles and Lord Slug appear and engage the heroes. It is revealed by King Kai that the villains are ghost warriors and will continually come back to life when killed unless defeated in the same way their lives were originally ended.

The heroes track Dr. Raichi down to the Dark Planet and engage him, discovering that his ghost warriors are generated by a machine called Hatchihyack, a device powered by the hate of the Tuffles. It is also revealed that Dr. Raichi is a ghost warrior himself, generated by Hatchihyack. When Vegeta vaporizes Raichi, preventing him from re-materializing, the hate Dr. Raichi had causes Hatchihyack to exceed its limit. Hatchihyack appears in a powerful android body. Hatchiyack devastates the heroes until the Saiyans, after having transformed into their Super Saiyan forms, combine their powers together into one massive wave of energy, ending the threat.

Reception
Dragon Ball Z Side Story: Plan to Eradicate the Saiyans sold 300,000 units in Japan. Japanese gaming magazine Famitsu gave the game a score of 22 out of 40.

Original video animation
The video game was adapted into an original video animation (OVA) series of the same name directed by Shigeyasu Yamauchi and released on VHS in two parts as strategy guides. The first volume was released on July 23, 1993, and the second was released on August 25, 1993. A soundtrack featuring music from the animation was released on CD on October 21, 1993. The OVA was later included in the second volume of the Dragon Ball Z Dragon Box DVD box set, which was released in 2003.

Cast
 Masako Nozawa as Goku, Gohan and Turles
 Ryō Horikawa as Vegeta
 Toshio Furukawa as Piccolo
 Takeshi Kusao as Trunks
 Hiromi Tsuru as Bulma
 Naoko Watanabe as Chi-Chi
 Toku Nishio as Mr. Popo
 Tomiko Suzuki as Dende
 Ryūsei Nakao as Frieza and Cooler
 Hisao Egawa as Monster / Goddo Gadon
 Yusaku Yara as Slug
 Shinji Ogawa as Dr. Raichi
 Jōji Yanami as Kaio-sama / Narration
 Hideo Ishikawa as Hatchihyack

Dragon Ball Z: True Plan to Eradicate the Saiyans
In 1994, footage from the OVA was reused in a separate Bandai video game for the Playdia console, . The game was released in two parts, a Space Arc on September 23, 1994 and an Earth Arc on December 16, 1994, and had some previously unseen scenes.

Dragon Ball: Plan to Eradicate the Super Saiyans

 is a 2010 OVA and remake of 1993's Dragon Ball Z Side Story: Plan to Eradicate the Saiyans. The OVA was included in the Namco Bandai Games video game Dragon Ball: Raging Blast 2, which was released on November 2, 2010. It later received a coupled DVD release with Dragon Ball: Episode of Bardock in the March issue of the monthly magazine Saikyō Jump, which was released on February 3, 2012.

Most of the voice cast from the original 1993 OVA returned for the remake, with the exception of Shinji Ogawa, who was replaced by Hiroshi Iwasaki as the voice of Dr. Lychee. The 2010 remake also does not feature the characters Mr. Popo, the Monsters, or Goddo Gadon.

References

External links 
 

1993 anime OVAs
1993 video games
1994 video games
Bandai games
Plan to Eradicate the Saiyans
Plan to Eradicate the Saiyans
1990s Japanese-language films
2010s Japanese-language films
Japan-exclusive video games
Nintendo Entertainment System-only games
Tose (company) games
Toei Animation original video animation
Video games developed in Japan
Video games scored by Miyuki Uemura
Video games scored by Takeshi Ichida